Nayana Apte Joshi (born 1950-) is an Indian singer-actress who worked in Marathi, Hindi and Gujarati Movies and stage plays.

Early years
She was taught classical music by her mother Shanta Apte, Indirabai Kelkar and Yashwant Bua Joshi. She got education of Natya Sangeet from Govindrao Patwardhan, Anna Pendharkar, Narayan Bodas and at times consulted and helped by Arvind Pilgaonkar. She gained a Bachelor of Arts degree in Literature (Sangeet Visharat in Classical Music)

Career
Apte had worked as a child artist with her mother late Shanta Apte in "Chandipuja" in 1957. She has acted in 65 Marathi plays and also some Gujarati plays. This includes different types of roles including comedy, mythological, historical, social, traditional classic musical plays and to-date current subjects. She has done 25 Marathi Movies, 4 Hindi Movies and 6 Gujarati Movies. She has acted in 16 television serials including Marathi and Hindi. She is given interviews on radio, speeches and claims to have advised new singers.

Filmography 

 Ammaldar - अंमलदार
 Ekach Pyala - एकच प्याला
 Karayla gelo Ek - करायला गेलो एक
 Dev Nahi Devharyat - देव नाही देव्हार्‍यात
 Daive Labhala CHintamani - दैवे लाभला चिंतामणी
 Navra Maza Muthit - नवरा माझ्या मुठीत
 Sangeet Punyaprabhav - संगीत पुण्यप्रभाव
 Sangeet Manapman - मानापमान
 MUknayak - मूकनायक
 Ya, Ghar Aaplach Aahe - या घर आपलंच आहे
 Lagnachi Bedi - लग्नाची बेडी
 Vaarcha Majla Rikama - वरचा मजला रिकामा
 Sangeet Sharda - संगीत शारदा
 Shri Tasi Sau - श्री तशी सौ
 Saujanyachi Aishi Taishi - सौजन्याची ऐशी तैशी
 Sangeet Swayanavar - संगीत स्वयंवर
 Hunnymoon Express - हनीमून एक्सप्रेस
 Ha Swarg Saat Pavlancha - हा स्वर्ग सात पावलांचा
 Sunechya Rashila Sasu - सुनेच्या राशीला सासू
 Dinuchya Sasubai Radhabai - दिनूच्या सासूबाई राधाबाई
 Tilak Ani Agarkar - टिळक आणि आगरकर

Films 

 Chupke Chupke - चुपकेचुपके (हिंदी, १९७५)
 Javaibapu Zindabad - जावईबापू झिंदाबाद
 Mili - मिली (हिंदी, १९७५)
 Nivdung - निवडुंग (मराठी)
 Ladigodi - लाडीगोडी (मराठी)
 Ek Full Char Half - एक फुल चार हाफ (मराठी, 1991)
Jawab (1995 film)- जवाब  (हिंदी, १९९५)
 Gav Tasa Changla - गाव तसं चांगलं (मराठी)
 Chal Love Kar - चल लव्ह कर (मराठी, 2009)
 Mazya Navryachi Bayako - माझ्या नवऱ्याची बायको (मराठी, 2013)
 Madhyamvarg - मध्यमवर्ग (मराठी, 2014)
 15 August (Netflix Movie) - १५ ऑगस्ट (मराठी नेटफ्लिक्स चित्रपट, 2019)

Television 

 Shanti
 Waqt Ki Raftaar
 Don’t Worry Ho Jayega
 Chuk Bhul Dyavi Ghyavi
 Sukhanchya Sarini He Mann Baware
 Gharoghari
 Bigg Boss Marathi 3 as Aaji's voice

Awards
 Padma Shri award in 2014
 Awards from Marathi Natya Parishad
 Awards from Kumar Kala Kendra
 Awards from Maharashtra Kala Kendra
 Mumbai Marathi Sahitya Sangha Award

References

External links
 

Indian film actresses
1950 births
People from Maharashtra
Actresses in Marathi cinema
20th-century Indian actresses
Living people
Recipients of the Padma Shri in arts